Potępa, alternative spelling Potempa, is a Polish surname. Notable people with the surname include:

 Annette Potempa (born 1976), German gymnast
 Wioletta Potępa (born 1980), Polish discus thrower

See also
 
 

Polish-language surnames